Shirahama (written: 白濱 or 白浜) may refer to:

Places
Shirahama, Chiba, a town in Chiba Prefecture, Japan
Shirahama, Wakayama, a town in Wakayama Prefecture, Japan
Shirahama Station, a railway station in Shirahama, Wakayama Prefecture, Japan

People with the surname
, Japanese performer, actor, and DJ
Ikuo Shirahama (born 1958), Japanese professional golfer
, Japanese fashion model and television personality known professionally as Loveli
, Japanese politician
, Japanese pirate of the late 16th and early 17th centuries
, Japanese professional basketball player

Japanese-language surnames